is a train station in Kizugawa, Kyoto Prefecture, Japan, operated by West Japan Railway Company (JR West). It has the station number "JR-D18".

Lines
Kamikoma Station is served by the Nara Line.

Layout
The station consists of two side platforms serving one track each. The platforms are connected by an overpass.

Platforms

History
Station numbering was introduced in March 2018 with Kamikoma being assigned station number JR-D18.

Passenger statistics
According to the Kyoto Prefecture statistical report, the average number of passengers per day is as follows. On the Nara Line, it is the station with the fewest passengers.

Adjacent stations

See also
 List of railway stations in Japan

References

External links
  

Railway stations in Japan opened in 1902
Railway stations in Kyoto Prefecture